WMJJ (96.5 FM, "Magic 96.5") is a radio station licensed to Birmingham, Alabama. Owned by San Antonio-based iHeartMedia, it broadcasts an adult contemporary format. This format temporarily switches to Christmas music for the months of November and December.  Its studios are located at Beacon Ridge Tower in Birmingham, and its transmitter is on the west end of the Red Mountain range.

The station carries a mainstream urban format, 104.1 The Beat, as well as K-Love, on HD Radio subchannels. They are simulcast in analog by 104.1 W281AB and 96.1 W241AI respectively.

History
This station began licensed broadcasting with 49,000 watts of effective radiated power on the 96.5 MHz frequency on June 1, 1961, as WCRT-FM. Under the joint ownership of Chapman Radio & Television Company, WCRT-FM was the sister station of WCRT (1260 AM, now known as WYDE).

In 1973, the station was sold to Magic City Broadcasting, moved to a taller antenna, increased power to an even 50,000 watts, and changed callsigns to WQEZ to reflect the station's shift to beautiful music.  In the late 1970s, the station increased its broadcast power to the present 100,000 watts.  Throughout the 1970s, there was very little choice in FM programming in Birmingham; most stations were either easy listening or album rock stations.  96.5 FM was the home of WQEZ "your 'Q' to E-Z listening".  The format consisted of instrumental music and soft vocals.

The station was sold in 1982 to Capitol Broadcasting, a company owned primarily by radio group owner Ken Johnson.  Ray Quinn, who had been Johnson's General Manager at his property in Louisville. Kentucky (WRKA) moved to Birmingham and built a new management team and changed its format to adult contemporary on December 27 of that year.  Until this time there were no FM stations in the market with this format.   The stations that came closest to filling this niche were WSGN, WAPI and Top-40 station WKXX. The new name of the station was Magic 96, and it has retained that name and format since then.

Quinn's original team included program director Bill Thomas and original sales manager Chris Gallu. Later, the sales team leadership included Steve Streiker who was General Sales Manager from 1983 until 1985.  Burt and Kurt hosted the morning show during the station's early years, Charlie Walker did middays, and Jeff Tyson handled evenings, both crossing the street from top-ranked (at the time) WKXX to join the station. When Bill Thomas left the programming chair to become VP/Programming for Capitol Broadcasting in the mid-80's, John Jenkins was promoted to Program Director, remaining in that position until he left the station to program WMAG-FM (also a Magic station) in Greensboro, N.C., which he took from a 3.8 to an 8.7 in ratings share. He was succeeded by Smokey Rivers, who broadened WMJJ's playlist to even dabble in classic rock and oldies at night for several years.

John Jenkins returned as Vice President of programming at Ameron Broadcasting in the early 1990s and returned the station's focus to mainstream adult contemporary music.  Under Ameron's ownership, the station remained consistently number one in women until it was sold to Capstar Broadcasting, which later merged with Clear Channel Communications, which owns the station today. The station began a promotion in the early 1980s that remained a fixture on the station for nearly a decade, the "Magic Alabama Lottery".  The promotion involved the mailing of numbered tickets to hundreds of thousands of Birmingham residents each Spring and Fall.  One listener won $96,000, one of the largest cash prizes ever given away by a Birmingham radio station. The station also gave away a $175,000 home in that promotion in the mid 1990s.

Magic 96 was one of the seminal adult contemporary radio stations of the 1980s. Innovations in programming, audience promotion, advertising sales management, advertising inventory management and pricing, were pioneered at WMJJ and were widely emulated by stations in other radio markets.

References

External links

MJJ
Mainstream adult contemporary radio stations in the United States
Radio stations established in 1961
IHeartMedia radio stations
1961 establishments in Alabama